Madeline Manning Mims (born January 11, 1948) is a former American runner. Between 1967 and 1981 she won ten national titles and set a number of American records. She participated in the 1968, 1972, and 1976 Summer Olympics. She likely also would have participated in the 1980 Games in Moscow, had they not been boycotted by the United States. At the 1968 Olympics she won a gold medal in the 800 m, one of only two American women to win this event. (To date, the other was Athing Mu who won gold in the 2020 Olympics.) Until 2008, she was the youngest winner of the event.  At the 1972 Games in Munich she won a silver medal in the  relay with teammates Mable Fergerson, Kathy Hammond, and Cheryl Toussaint.
When she was 3 years old, she was diagnosed with spinal meningitis and not expected to live. She recovered, but was consistently sick until she was a teen.

In 1965, while she was a student at John Hay High School in Cleveland, she won her first national title in the 440-yard run at the girls' AAU championships. She was named to the U.S. team that competed in meets against West Germany, the USSR and Poland. From 1967 to 1980, Manning-Mims won 10 national indoor and outdoor titles.

Manning is a graduate of Tennessee State University and a famed member of their TigerBelles. In 1984 she was inducted into the United States National Track and Field Hall of Fame.

Manning is founder and president of the United States Council for Sports Chaplaincy and has been a chaplain at the 1988 Seoul, 1992 Barcelona, 1996 Atlanta, 2000 Sydney, 2004 Athens, and 2008 Beijing Olympic Games. She also has a ministry through sports and the arts known as Ambassadorship, Inc.  She is also an author, speaker and contemporary gospel recording artist, who was inducted into the Oklahoma Jazz Hall of Fame in 2005.  She is currently studying for a Master of Divinity degree at Oral Roberts University in Tulsa, Oklahoma, and is one of the chaplains of the Tulsa Shock of the WNBA.

She competed through the mid 1970s under the hyphenated name of Madeline Manning-Jackson.  She married John Jackson in 1969 but divorced him by 1970.  Her son from that marriage, John Jackson III was the NCAA Triple Jump champion while competing at the University of Oklahoma.  After briefly retiring from the sport, she returned running with anger and frustration, to the point that her coach had to train her separately from other athletes on her team and had to ask her to slow down.

In 1976, Jackson released the gospel soul album Madeline: Running for Jesus with NewPax.

References

External links

 
 
 
 

1948 births
Living people
American female middle-distance runners
American female sprinters
Tennessee State Lady Tigers track and field athletes
Athletes (track and field) at the 1967 Pan American Games
Athletes (track and field) at the 1968 Summer Olympics
Athletes (track and field) at the 1972 Summer Olympics
Athletes (track and field) at the 1976 Summer Olympics
Olympic gold medalists for the United States in track and field
Track and field athletes from Cleveland
Oral Roberts University alumni
Medalists at the 1972 Summer Olympics
Medalists at the 1968 Summer Olympics
Pan American Games medalists in athletics (track and field)
Pan American Games gold medalists for the United States
Olympic silver medalists for the United States in track and field
Universiade medalists in athletics (track and field)
Universiade gold medalists for the United States
Medalists at the 1967 Summer Universiade
Medalists at the 1967 Pan American Games
Olympic female sprinters